The 2001 All-Big 12 Conference football team consists of American football players chosen as All-Big 12 Conference players for the 2001 NCAA Division I-A football season.  The conference recognizes two official All-Big 12 selectors: (1) the Big 12 conference coaches selected separate offensive and defensive units and named first- and second-team players (the "Coaches" team); and (2) a panel of sports writers and broadcasters covering the Big 12 also selected offensive and defensive units and named first- and second-team players (the "Media" team).

Offensive selections

Quarterbacks
 Eric Crouch, Nebraska (Coaches-1; Media-1)
 Kliff Kingsbury, Texas Tech (Coaches-2; Media-2)

Running backs
 Cortlen Johnson, Colorado (Coaches-1)
 Ennis Haywood, Iowa State (Coaches-1; Media-1)
 Dahrran Diedrick, Nebraska (Coaches-2; Media-1)
 Ricky Williams, Texas Tech (Coaches-1; Media-2)
 Josh Scobey, Kansas State (Coaches-2; Media-2)

Centers
 Seth McKinney, Texas A&M (Coaches-1; Media-1)
 Wayne Lucier, Colorado (Media-2)
 Justin Hartwig, Kansas (Coaches-2)

Guards
 Toniu Fonoti, Nebraska (Coaches-1; Media-1)
 Andre Gurode, Colorado (Coaches-1; Media-1)
 Rex Richards, Texas Tech (Coaches-2; Media-2)
 Greg Jerman, Baylor (Coaches-2)
 Marcel Howard, Iowa State (Media-2)

Tackles
 Frank Romero, Oklahoma (Coaches-1; Media-1)
 Mike Williams, Texas (Coaches-1; Media-1)
 Victor Rogers, Colorado (Media-2)
 Dave Volk, Nebraska (Coaches-2; Media-2)
 Aaron Crittendon, Missouri (Coaches-2)

Tight ends
 Daniel Graham, Colorado (Coaches-1; Media-1)
 Trent Smith, Oklahoma (Coaches-2; Media-2)

Receivers
 Justin Gage, Missouri (Coaches-1; Media-1)
 Roy Williams, Texas (Coaches-1; Media-1)
 Reggie Newhouse, Baylor (Media-2)
 Antwone Savage, Oklahoma (Coaches-2)
 Rashaun Woods, Oklahoma State (Coaches-2; Media-2)

Defensive selections

Defensive linemen
 Tommie Harris, Oklahoma (Coaches-1; Media-1)
 Cory Redding, Texas (Coaches-1; Media-1)
 Jimmy Wilkerson, Oklahoma (Coaches-1; Media-1)
 Justin Bannan, Colorado (Coaches-1; Media-2)
 Nate Dwyer, Kansas (Coaches-1; Media-2)
 Aaron Hunt, Texas Tech (Coaches-2; Media-1)
 Chris Kelsay, Nebraska (Coaches-2; Media-2)
 Cory Heinecke, Oklahoma (Coaches-2)
 Kory Klein, Oklahoma (Coaches-2)
 Tank Reese, Kansas State (Coaches-2)
 Keith Wright, Missouri (Coaches-2)
 Rocky Bernard, Texas A&M (Media-2)

Linebackers
 Rocky Calmus, Oklahoma (Coaches-1; Media-1)
 Ben Leber, Kansas State (Coaches-1; Media-1)
 Lawrence Flugence, Texas Tech (Coaches-2; Media-1)
 D.D. Lewis, Texas (Coaches-2; Media-1)
 Jamie Burrow, Nebraska (Media-2)
 Dwayne Levels, Oklahoma State (Media-2)
 Jarrod Penright, Texas A&M (Media-2)
 Jamonte Robinson, Missouri (Media-2)

Defensive backs
 Quentin Jammer, Texas (Coaches-1; Media-1)
 Keyuo Craver, Nebraska (Coaches-1; Media-1)
 Roy Williams, Oklahoma (Coaches-1; Media-1)
 Michael Lewis, Colorado (Coaches-1; Media-1)
 Sammy Davis, Texas A&M (Coaches-1; Media-2)
 Kevin Curtis, Texas Tech (Coaches-2; Media-2)
 Nathan Vasher, Texas (Coaches-2; Media-2)
 Brandon Everage, Oklahoma (Coaches-2)
 Terence Newman, Kansas State (Coaches-2)
 Derrick Strait, Oklahoma (Media-2)

Special teams

Kickers
 Jeremy Flores, Colorado (Coaches-1; Media-1)
 Luke Phillips, Oklahoma State (Coaches-2; Media-2)

Punters
 Jeff Ferguson, Oklahoma (Coaches-1; Media-1)
 Adam Stiles, Baylor (Coaches-2; Media-2)

All-purpose / Return specialists
 Roman Hollowell, Colorado (Coaches-1; Media-2)
 Ricky Williams, Texas Tech (Media-1)
 Chris Massey, Oklahoma State (Coaches-1)
 Nathan Vasher, Texas (Coaches-2)
 Aaron Lockett, Kansas State (Coaches-2)

Key
Bold = selected as a first-team player by both the coaches and media panel

Coaches = selected by Big 12 Conference coaches

Media = selected by a media panel

See also
2001 College Football All-America Team

References

All-Big 12 Conference
All-Big 12 Conference football teams